Mark Rudman (born 1948 New York City) is an American poet. He is a former professor at Columbia University and New York University.

He graduated from The New School with a BA, and from Columbia University with an MFA. 
His work has appeared in Salt magazine, The Nation, and New York Review of Books.

He is married and lives in New York City.

Awards
The National Book Critics Circle Award in poetry, for Rider
Max Hayward Award for translation of Pasternak's My Sister, Life
Ingram Merrill Foundation fellowship
National Endowment for the Arts fellowship
1996 Guggenheim Fellow
Academy American Poets Prize
Denver Quarterly Prize
CCLM Editor's Fellowship

Works
By contraries and other poems, University of Maine, 1987,  
The nowhere steps, Sheep Meadow Press, 1990,

Translations

Non-fiction
Diverse voices: essays on poets and poetry, Story Line Press, 1993; 2009 
 
Robert Lowell and the Poetic Act (2007)

References

External links
Poet's website
http://www.drunkenboat.com/db8/panlitpoetry/rudman/

Writers from Manhattan
Living people
1948 births
Columbia University School of the Arts alumni
York College, City University of New York faculty
The New School alumni